Groß Santersleben is a village and a former municipality in the Börde district in Saxony-Anhalt, Germany. Since 1 January 2010, it has been part of the Hohe Börde municipality.

Former municipalities in Saxony-Anhalt
Hohe Börde